Innisfil GO Station is a planned GO Transit train station to be built by Metrolinx on the Barrie line in Innisfil, Ontario as part of its GO Expansion program. A parking lot, a bus loop and a park and ride area will be provided. In 2016, Metrolinx rated the station location highly for affordability of construction but low for ridership, which is expected to be 2,800 per day in 2031. The town of Innisfil wants construction to begin in 2022 and is working with Cortel Group, a developer in the area, to get the station open by September 2022. In 2020, the cost to build the station was estimated to be CA$29 million. As of May 2022, construction is expected to begin in 2023.

A station in Innisfil had first been proposed in a 2010 GO Transit system electrification study. In 2015, Metrolinx proposed it again as part of a larger list of potential future station sites, and it was ultimately included in the list of stations to be built within the RER program. In 2016, there were 2 potential sites for a station in Innisfil: 5th Line and 6th Line. The location of the station had been controversial among residents and developers in the area. Innisfil Town Council supported the 6th line location and it was ultimately chosen by Metrolinx.

In November 2019, Cortel Group committed to funding the full cost of the station and the Innisfil Town Council approved a long-term development vision around the station, with the goal of 30,000 people living in the area in the near future and 150,000 people living in the area once the development is completed. In 2020, a minister's zoning order (MZO) was issued by the provincial government to expedite the residential development project.

References

Future GO Transit railway stations
Proposed railway stations in Canada
Railway stations in Simcoe County